The 2014–15 season was the 116th season in Athletic Club’s history and the 84th in the top-tier. The campaign was notable for Athletic competing in the UEFA Champions League for the first time since 1998–99.

Squad
As 2014..

Squad and statistics

The numbers and stats are established according to the official website: ''

From the youth system

Transfers in

Total spending:  €1,000,000

Transfers out

Total revenue:  €36,000,000

Pre-season and friendlies

Competitions

La Liga

League table

Results by round

Matches

Copa del Rey

Round of 32

Round of 16

Quarter-finals

Semi-finals

Final

UEFA Champions League

Play-off round

Group stage

UEFA Europa League

Round of 32

References

Athletic Bilbao seasons
Athletic Bilbao
Athletic